Silino is the name of several rural localities in Russia:
Silino, Kaluga Oblast, a selo in Meshchovsky District of Kaluga Oblast
Silino, Kemerovo Oblast, a selo in Yelykayevskaya Rural Territory of Kemerovsky District in Kemerovo Oblast; 
Silino, Kirov Oblast, a village in Smetaninsky Rural Okrug of Sanchursky District in Kirov Oblast; 
Silino, Leningrad Oblast, a village in Krasnoozernoye Settlement Municipal Formation of Priozersky District in Leningrad Oblast; 
Silino, Republic of Mordovia, a selo in Silinsky Selsoviet of Ardatovsky District in the Republic of Mordovia; 
Silino, Moscow Oblast, a village in Ashitkovskoye Rural Settlement of Voskresensky District in Moscow Oblast; 
Silino, Diveyevsky District, Nizhny Novgorod Oblast, a village in Ivanovsky Selsoviet of Diveyevsky District in Nizhny Novgorod Oblast; 
Silino, Shatkovsky District, Nizhny Novgorod Oblast, a selo in Silinsky Selsoviet of Shatkovsky District in Nizhny Novgorod Oblast; 
Silino, Tula Oblast, a village in Samarskaya Volost of Kurkinsky District in Tula Oblast
Silino, Tver Oblast, a village in Mogilevskoye Rural Settlement of Kuvshinovsky District in Tver Oblast
Silino, Vologda Oblast, a village in Staroselsky Selsoviet of Vologodsky District in Vologda Oblast